Senator Hooper may refer to:

Ed Hooper (politician) (born 1947), Florida State Senate
J. Robert Hooper (1936–2008), Maryland State Senate
Samuel Hooper (1808–1875), Massachusetts State Senate

See also
Senator Hopper (disambiguation)